Quantum Redshift is a futuristic racing game for the Xbox console, developed by Curly Monsters and published by Microsoft Game Studios in 2002.

Description 
Created by Wipeout designer Nick Burcombe, the game puts the player in the shoes of 16 different characters, paired off in rivalries, whose stories unfold as tournaments are completed. The game has five different speed limits, which act as the difficulty levels for the game. Points earned after races allow players to upgrade their hovercraft's offensive and defensive capabilities.

The game featured an original soundtrack by Dutch musician Junkie XL.

The biggest selling point of Quantum Redshift was the graphics detail it possessed. Water and glass would show real-time reflections, each of the game worlds were abundant with high-resolution textures, and the camera "lens" would be flecked with water droplets after being submerged. Quantum Redshift was rated as one of the most graphically advanced games for the Xbox.

Reception 
While featuring 16 different characters, critics generally noted that there was not anything particularly "likable" about the characters. On release, Famitsu magazine scored the game a 30 out of 40. It was nominated for GameSpots annual "Best Driving Game on Xbox" award, which went to Rallisport Challenge.

Despite the critical response to Quantum Redshift being positive, garnering 76% at GameRankings, the game sold poorly. As a result, the second game, which was to include multi-play over Xbox Live was cancelled by Microsoft, and Curly Monsters closed shop shortly thereafter. As Curly Monsters said a statement before they closed down "We were pursuing a number of avenues, and we'd developed some really cool new Xbox technology, but unfortunately we were not able to sign a deal prior to us running out of cash... we've not been able to pay our staff for the last month, and now it's time to (unfortunately) call it quits... I expect you'll see and hear from us in various guises as we spread out amongst other developers."

References

External links

Microsoft games
Microsoft franchises
Xbox games
Xbox-only games
Racing video games
2002 video games
Science fiction racing games
Video games developed in the United Kingdom
Video games featuring female protagonists
Multiplayer and single-player video games
Video games scored by Junkie XL